Markham Bay may refer to:

 Markham Bay (Antarctica)
 Markham Bay (Papua New Guinea)
 Markham Bay (Baffin Island)